Royal Air Force Stradishall or more simply RAF Stradishall is a former Royal Air Force station located  north east of Haverhill, Suffolk and  south west of Bury St Edmunds, Suffolk, England. Part of the site remains in use as Stradishall Training Area.

History

In his memoirs, Murray Peden, a Royal Canadian Air Force pilot, recounts his training at Stradishall. In the RAF's "heavy conversion unit" (No. 1657 Heavy Conversion Unit) at the airfield, he and others were trained to fly Short Stirling bombers. He describes in detail his experiences flying there, and the life on the ground of aircrew who were shortly to begin operations over Nazi Germany as part of RAF Bomber Command during the Second World War.

The airfield was home to a number of squadrons during its lifetime:

The following units were also here at some point:

Current use
The airfield closed in 1970 and is now the site of two category C prisons: HMP Highpoint North and HMP Highpoint South. Part of the former airfield remains a Ministry of Defence training site which is not accessible to the public.

The airfield has been sold to a private buyer to be converted into farm land.

The Airfield is a Solar Farm with grazing for cattle and nature walk. It is open from dawn to dusk.

There is a memorial to RAF Stradishall outside Stirling House which was once part of the officers quarters and is now a training unit for the Prison service.

References

Citations

Bibliography

External links

 History of Bomber Command
 Unit details
 RAF Stradishall
 RAF Stradishall history

Military units and formations established in 1938
Royal Air Force stations in Suffolk
Royal Air Force stations of World War II in the United Kingdom